Bachelard is a surname. Notable people with the surname include:

Gaston Bachelard (1884–1962), French philosopher
Michael Bachelard (born 1968), Australian journalist and author